Kingston College of Science, established in 2004, is a general degree college at Berunanpukuria, North 24 Parganas in the Indian state of West Bengal. It offers undergraduate courses in sciences.  It is affiliated to West Bengal State University.

Departments

Science

Physics
Mathematics
Computer Science
Microbiology
Biochemistry
Electronics
Food and Nutrition
Statistics

See also
Education in India
List of colleges in West Bengal
Education in West Bengal
Kingston Law College

References

External links
http://kcscal.edu.in/

Educational institutions established in 2004
Colleges affiliated to West Bengal State University
Universities and colleges in North 24 Parganas district
2004 establishments in West Bengal